Rear-Admiral James de Courcy Hamilton  (1 February 1860 – 24 February 1936) was a British Royal Navy officer and fire officer. He was the Chief Officer of the London Fire Brigade from 1903 to 1909.

Hamilton joined the Royal Navy, and was promoted to commander on 31 December 1895, and to captain on 1 January 1901. After he retired from the navy, he served as Chief Officer of the London Fire Brigade from 1903 to 1909, and for his service was appointed a Member of the Royal Victorian Order 4th class (MVO) on 19 July 1909.

Hamilton was promoted to rear-admiral on the Retired list on 22 July 1910.

He was married, and had a son William Evelyn de Courcy Hamilton born in late 1902.

References 
 

1860 births
1936 deaths
Members of the Royal Victorian Order
Royal Navy rear admirals
Royal Navy personnel of the Anglo-Egyptian War
London Fire Brigade personnel
Members of Trinity House